Bucaramanga is the capital and largest city of the department of Santander, Colombia. Bucaramanga has the fifth-largest economy by GDP in Colombia, has the lowest unemployment rate and is the ninth most populous city in the country, with a population of 613,400 (2023 projection). Bucaramanga has over 160 parks scattered throughout the city and has been given the nickname "La Ciudad de Los Parques" ("The City of Parks") and "La Ciudad Bonita de Colombia" ("Colombia's Beautiful City").

Bucaramanga has grown rapidly since the 1960s, mostly into neighbouring locations within the metropolitan area. Floridablanca, Girón and Piedecuesta are inextricably linked geographically and commercially with Bucaramanga, and now all form together the Bucaramanga Metropolitan Area with a population of 1,304,288.

The city is the base of the Colombian Petroleum Institute (ICP), the research branch of the state oil company Ecopetrol.

History

Girón was the first and most significant town founded by Spanish colonialists in the region, and Bucaramanga (founded on 22 December 1622) did not overtake Girón in population or economic significance until the early 19th century. The city attracted a core of German merchants and adventurers in the 1860s and 1870s (the most famous of whom was Geo von Lengerke) and tensions between the newcomers and local merchants flared in 1879, when the event named "La Culebra Pico de Oro" ("The Gold Beak Snake") occurred. With the political reorganization of 1886, Bucaramanga replaced Socorro as the departmental capital. The region (although not the city itself) was devastated by the civil war of 1899–1902—commonly known as the Thousand Days War—causing Bucaramanga to grow only modestly in the first half of the 20th century.

Climate
Bucaramanga is located on a plateau in the Cordillera Oriental of the Colombian Andes, and many residents occupy unstable lands descending steeply from the meseta. Eastbound, the Andean Range rises up in high peaks, reaching almost  AMSL in the place locally known as "Paramo de Berlin".
The official metropolitan area includes the municipalities of: Girón, Piedecuesta and Floridablanca, but Lebrija is home to Bucaramanga's airport and is commonly considered part of greater Bucaramanga. Despite recent urbanization, all four neighboring municipalities contain extensive rural areas.

Under the Köppen climate classification, Bucaramanga features a tropical monsoon climate, though a noticeably cool version of the climate. The city is slightly too dry for a tropical rainforest climate, as its driest month of January averages just under  of rainfall. Although its altitude is not considered very high, Bucaramanga's climate is neither hot nor cold, 22 degrees Celsius being the average temperature. Compared to cities at the same average altitude (such as Cali), Bucaramanga has much cooler daytime temperatures, owing to the cold wind coming down the eastern peaks; its night temperatures are not cold, owing to the warm air coming from the canyon. These phenomena make the daily thermal oscillation narrower than in other Colombian cities.

Municipal flag
The municipal flag of Bucaramanga was designed by the historian Gustavo Gómez Mejía.  Made of two green stripes with a yellow one in the middle. In the center, there's a blue disk, surrounded by a red circle. In the middle of the blue disk, there's a white star. In the red circle the following legend: "Below the azure of its sky and defended by the generous blood of its sons, Bucaramanga is opened to the four horizons of the motherland" is written.

Municipal coat of arms

The words Montani Semper Liberi are Latin for "Mountaineers are Always Free".

Demography 
According to the data obtained from the 2018 census and information provided by the Metropolitan Area of Bucaramanga, the city has an estimated population of 681,130 inhabitants.

Of the total population, 47.5% are men and 52.5% women. The average number of occupants per household is 3.6 people. 16.6% of people of the population are 10 years of age or younger. Of all cohabiting couples in the city, 46.3% were single, 26.7% were married, 5.8% were separated and 4.6% were widowed. 9.2% of the resident population aged over 4 years are from another municipality, and 0.3% from another country.

In the city, 39% of people live in houses, while 56.7% live in apartments and 4.3% in a leased room or other.

Economy

Industry 

An industrial activity developed in Bucaramanga that has gained national recognition is the footwear industry. For this reason, the Footwear Manufacturers' Association (Asoinducals) is located in the city. The footwear sector has a major market nationally and internationally in countries such as Argentina, Brazil, Canada, Ecuador, Italy, some Caribbean islands, United States, Peru, Venezuela and Mexico. 

There is also a big clothing industry. There are a growing number of technological research centers in various topics such as energy, gas, oil, corrosion, asphalt, leather and agro-industrial development tools, among others.

The Chimitá Industrial Zone is located in the western area of the plateau near the town of Girón; many companies from different specialties like Terpel have production plants there. Also in the city is one of the main production plants of Cervecería Bavaria S.A. (Bavaria Brewery). The city is planning to build the Zona Franca de Santander, a customs-free zone located within the metropolitan area of Bucaramanga. 

Bucaramanga has positioned itself as a city of congresses and events, having infrastructures like Fair and Exhibition Centre - CENFER, many fairs, and exhibitions in all branches of the national economic sectors are performed there annually.

The city also has a polyfunctional center for events and shows, which gives a space for performing great shows, puzzle games, sports, and business. A number of meeting rooms and conferences allow Bucaramanga to hold conventions for entrepreneurs around the country.

The trade fairs, as well as direct benefits to the respective sector, have benefits in other areas of the economy such as transport, hotels, restaurants, shops and various services activities such as advertising, design and decoration, modeling, etc.

The International Exhibition of Children's Fashion (EIMI) takes place in Bucaramanga. It is the only exhibition specialized in children's clothing in Latin America. The event is organized in the CENFER complex and 40% of the sales generated come from exported products.

Business 
In recent years, several major shopping centers and commercial buildings have been built in Bucaramanga. An example is the shopping center La Florida, a six-storey mall with two pedestrian bridges and one vehicular bridge. A newer shopping center, Megamall, was built in 2007, where the first store of the French multinational retailer Carrefour opened in the city. 

In the following years, three more shopping centers were built in other areas of the city: Cacique, Parque Caracolí, and De la Cuesta. Another shopping district known as "Cabecera del Llano" includes five major shopping centers: Cabecera Etapa I, Etapa II and Etapa III, as well as the more recognized Cabecera Etapa IV and the shopping center "La Quinta" or V Etapa. 

The Acropolis Shopping Center is located in an area known as Ciudadela Real de Minas, while the San Andresito commercial center and the traditional and renovated (2005) Cañaveral shopping center are located in the southern sector of the city along with the El Cacique shopping center, opened in November 2012 and considered one of the largest in Latin America. 

In these shopping centers, there are several movie theaters of major companies such as Cine Colombia, Cine Royal and Cinemark, clothing stores like Adidas, Levi's, and national brands such as Arturo Calle, restaurants and cafes as Presto, El Corral, McDonald's, Crêpes & Waffles, Juan Valdez.

One of the largest hypermarket chains in Colombia, Exito, has five stores throughout the city and a distribution center for eastern Colombia. 

Carrefour opened in 2007 the first store at Megamall, merging later with a local supermarket named Mercadefam. The chain now has seven stores in the city. Along with this, there are local small chain stores in Bucaramanga such as Mercomfenalco, Cootracolta, Cajasan, and others.

Labor market 
Historically, Bucaramanga has had one of the lowest rates of unemployment among Colombian cities. As of September 2010, according to DANE statistics between July and September 2010, the city had an unemployment rate of 11.8%, increasing by 3.3% compared to October and December 2009 which showed a rate of 8.5%.

Transport 

Metrolínea is the Integrated Mass Transit System of Bucaramanga. Its construction began in 2006 during the administration of Mayor Honorio Galvis; its operation is currently in its first phase, which began on 22 December 2009. The six lines inaugurated in this phase are: Avenida del Libertador (Diagonal 15), autocentral, Prospero Finch Avenue (27th Avenue), La Cumbre, Highway Floridablanca Villabel Bucarica and which have 91 stopways. The administration is currently in the process of coupling the second phase, which will cover the areas of Piedecuesta, Ciudadela Real de Minas, the Avenue of the Americas (Race 33) and will have trunks at Autosur, Real de Minas and the Americas.

National road connection 
Bucaramanga is connected to the mainland by two main routes. The first is the National Route 66 which comes from Barrancabermeja and Cucuta communicates with and then into Venezuela, the second the Ruta Nacional 45A that comes from Bogotá and San Alberto comes up this road connects with the Colombian Caribbean region and major cities across the Ruta Nacional 45.

Air transport 

The international airport serving Bucaramanga is Palonegro International Airport, located on the hill of Palonegro, west of the metropolitan area and close to the town of Lebrija.

The airport opened in 1974, replacing the old airport Gómez Niño located in the Ciudadela Real de Minas. The airport currently operates under the administration of the Palonegro consortium Colombo-Korean SAS East Airports Group. There are daily flights from most major cities in Colombia, as well as international flights from the city of Panama.

In 2009, Palonegro International Airport was ranked among Colombia's most important airports.

People
Many important Colombian people are from Bucaramanga, such as Luis Carlos Galán, presidential candidate murdered in 1989, Carlos Ardila Lülle, one of the most important businessmen in Colombia, Claudia Florez and Ivan Garzón.

Colombian artist Oscar Rodríguez Naranjo came back from France during the Second World War and settled in Bucaramanga. Rodríguez Naranjo taught at the art school while he made a number of paintings that would build up his reputation in Colombia. In 1941 he became the Director of the Academia de Bellas Artes in Bucaramanga.

Education
The city has a good reputation due to its numerous universities, among them:
Industrial University of Santander (Universidad Industrial de Santander)

The Universidad Industrial de Santander is an official institution that offers 95 degrees and a wide range of undergraduate and graduate courses within the health sciences, humanities, sciences, and engineering colleges. Also, it offers seven technological programs in different fields through the Distance Learning Institute. Nowadays, after 71 years of existence, there are nearly 14,000 students registered in undergraduate and graduate programs, as well as a total 22,000 alumni. It proudly stands as the leading higher education institution in the northeastern part of the country and ranks fourth among official universities nationwide. Also, the University has created affiliate branches in Barrancabermeja—home of the most important oil refinery in the country—El Socorro and Málaga. Recently it has extended its services to Barranquilla and Bogotá through the offer of its Graduate Programs.
Universidad Autónoma de Bucaramanga (UNAB) Autonomous University of Bucaramanga
Universidad de Santander (UDES)
Unidades Tecnológicas de Santander (UTS)
Saint Thomas Aquinas University (Universidad Santo Tomás)
Pontifical Bolivarian University (Universidad Pontificia Bolivariana)

Culture 

Bucaramanga's culture has several expressions, from the visual arts such as painting, sculpture, photography, and recently also in experimental demonstrations that incorporate new technology for artistic communication, such as video. Throughout Bucaramanga's history, it has hosted many cultural offerings in various areas, causing arts groups to form within the city.

One of the main pillars of culture in Bucaramanga is literature, as in the past there was a local cultural movement that produced a number of writers.

In 1995, the administration of Mayor Luis Fernando Peña Cote decided to convert Gabriel Turbay Public Library to hold the newly created Municipal Institute of Culture, assigning the library building to Gabriel Turbay, who has overseen space management for the institute, which has meant the movement of areas of the library to use the administrative area of the Municipal Institute of Culture. The creation of the Municipal Institute of Culture was conceived in order to expand the possibilities for sponsoring culture in the metropolitan area. But as culture has not traditionally played a leading role in local government, colleges do not receive sufficient funding and incentives to fulfill their purposes.

The Institute provides library services, art workshops, and a variety of shows and cultural work from the different neighborhoods of the city. The city sponsors these cultural activities with private investment. Bucaramanga also features a cultural radio station (Station Cultural Luis Carlos Galán Sarmiento) on 100.7 FM.

Gastronomy 

Typical dishes from Bucaramanga include Santander-mute (a soup made from various grains and accompanied by various types of meat), fricassee, a preparation of viscera and goat blood mixed with white rice, roasted meat, arepa de maize pelado, and tamales.

Also popular are candied celery, lemon, citron, rice, caramel, and pineapple. Most are produced in the Floridablanca neighboring. The Oblea, a large, communion-like wafer and bocadillo veleño (a type of fudge made from puréed fruit or pressed caramel, or dulce de leche (milk caramel) are examples of treats found in great quantity in Bucaramanga. Nevertheless, one of the exotic foods in this Colombian city is undoubtedly the "Hormiga Culona" or big-butt ants, which have made Bucaramanga famous nationally and internationally, eventually being exported to Tokyo and London. These ants have high protein content, and their consumption among local people dates from the prehispanic era. This delicacy is only available during certain time of the year, due to the fact that they only come out during the months of May and June.

Tourism 

A variety of tourism can be performed in Bucaramanga and its neighboring municipalities, such as ecological tourism through its parks, adventure tourism at the Ruitoque Plateau, and Paragliding at the "Voladero the Águilas", at just a 15 minute drive away from the city. The downtown area boasts colonial buildings like the churches of San Laureano, and the Dolores Chapel, among some widely recognised colonial houses such as the house of Simon Bolivar, and the Louis Peru de Lacroix' house. Other colonial buildings are located in the neighboring municipalities of the city. Bucaramanga's tourism diversity earned it the title of being one of the seven national pride tourism destinations through a voting process convened by Colombia is Passion and Bavaria.

Bucaramanga has wide hotel infrastructure composed by some of the best hotel chains in the country. Several areas of the city center have important restaurants and nightclubs.

Lookouts 

Morrorico: Located east of Bucaramanga, the road to Cucuta, you can see a panorama of the city, here is the statue of Sacred Heart, which is visited at Easter time, and the inhabitants and parishioners sector have the belief that the statue does miracles. Also in this area is planned the construction of a cable car or cable metrocable called to transport the inhabitants of the sector.

Palonegro: On the road to the airport of the same name, where you can have a splendid view of the metropolitan area of Bucaramanga. in place encuentan whereabouts visited several nightclubs and especially on weekends.

Natural and Historic Attractions 

 'Chicamocha National Park (PANACHI): on the road that leads to Bogotá at the maximum height of the Cordillera Oriental in the municipality of ARATOCA, offers an exceptional view of the mighty river canyon Chicamocha, is equally Chicamocha National Park, from where you can appreciate at its best canons of rivers Chicamocha and Suarez.Giron:: Located 9 km of Bucaramanga. Founded in 1631, the gold mines were important during the colonial era of tremendous architectural heritage, which made it a national monument. Stands the Museum of Religious Art, with valuable paintings and ancient liturgical objects, The Basilica of the Lord of Miracles, pilgrimage site, and the Chapel of Corregidor, on the outskirts.Socorro: Located  from Bucaramanga. Cradle of the uprising of the villagers, is located in the province Comunera, northeastern department of Santander. It was founded in 1681 and 1711 he was awarded the title of "Very Noble and Loyal Villa". In 1781 Manuela Beltrán broke the edict that raised taxes and contributions, which led to the revolt of the Communards. In the main square stand monuments to José Antonio Galán, leader of the uprising, and Antonia Santos. Other attractions are the house of culture and the cathedral.Barichara: Located  from the city of Bucaramanga, Barichara was founded by the Parra family Pradilla to serve the veneration of the Virgin of the Stone. In May 1975 the town received the title of "Cutest little town in Colombia" and by Resolution 005 of 30 June 1975 was declared a National Monument. The historic center of the town with steep streets and on the banks of the river Fonce National Monument. One of its main attractions is the park The Gallineral, occupying an island in the river, the moss hanging from the trees and the sound of water make it a must-visit site.
Other attractions are the San Gil Ragonessi ecological park, spa blue well, the Grotto Hill, Cerro de La Cruz and adventure sports like rafting, mountain climbing, mountain biking and motocross, among others.

Sports

Indersantander and Inderbu are the entities responsible for the management and development of local sport in Santander.

Football 

Bucaramanga has the Estadio Alfonso López, with a current capacity of 28,000. This stadium is the home of the local football teams Atlético Bucaramanga and Real Santander.

Other sports 

The Coliseo Bicentenario, built for the 2011 AMF Futsal World Championships held in Colombia, has a capacity of 8,000 spectators. It is currently the home stadium of the Búcaros Santander basketball team.

Another sports complex in the city is the Edmundo Luna Santos Coliseum, located in the Ciudadela Real de Minas area.

Bucaramanga has twice hosted the National Games in 1941 and 1996. The city also hosted the Pan American Cycling Championships in the year 2000.
Bucaramanga was one of the cities that hosted the 2016 FIFA Futsal World Cup.

Transportation

Local Bus: Metrolinea
Intercity Bus: Terminal de Transportes de Bucaramanga
Main airport: Palonegro International Airport

Bucaramanga Public Transportation Statistics
The average amount of time people spend commuting with public transit in Bucaramanga, for example to and from work, on a weekday, is 57 minutes. Ten percent of public transit riders, ride for more than 2 hours every day. The average amount of time people wait at a stop or station for public transit is 14 minutes, while 19% of riders wait for over 20 minutes on average every day. The average distance people usually ride in a single trip with public transit is 5.6 km, while 10% travel for over 12 km in a single direction.

Tourism
 Chicamocha National Park

Malls
 El Cacique Mall
 Gratamira Mall

Media
 Newspaper: Vanguardia Liberal
 Television: Televisión Regional del Oriente

People from Bucaramanga
 Julián Leal

References

External links

 Tourism information Bucaramanga
 Bucaramanga Link
 Bucaramanga.com
 Website of the mayor's office
 City photo Guide
 Metropolitan area of Bucaramanga
 Local Chamber of Commerce
Bucaramanga Daily Photo
 Vanguardia Liberal; Cuando a Bucaramanga la hicieron capital

Municipalities of Santander Department
Populated places established in 1622
Capitals of Colombian departments
1622 establishments in the Spanish Empire